Pepler is a surname. Notable people with the surname include:

Conrad Pepler (1908-1993), British priest
Debra Pepler, Canadian psychologist
George Pepler (1882–1959), British town planner 
Hilary Douglas Clark Pepler (1878–1951), British printer, writer and poet
Marian Pepler (1904–1997), British architect and textile designer
Tina Pepler, British dramatist